Streptomyces thermoviolaceus is a thermophilic bacterium species from the genus of Streptomyces which has been isolated from composts. Streptomyces thermoviolaceus produces chitinase and peroxidase.

Further reading

See also 
 List of Streptomyces species

References

External links
Type strain of Streptomyces thermoviolaceus at BacDive -  the Bacterial Diversity Metadatabase

thermoviolaceus
Bacteria described in 1957